Natalie Kwadrans (born Natalie Andrès on February 14, 1973 in Montreal, Quebec) is a French-Canadian athlete. She is a former athlete who competed for the Canadian Snowboard Team between 1995 and 1998. She is no longer a competitive athlete.

In early 2019, Natalie was diagnosed with stage 4, de novo metastatic breast cancer (MBC). She has currently exceeded her life expectancy and writes about her cancer experiences on her blog “Making lemonade and memories”

Sports career
In 1990, Kwadrans' younger brother inspired her to try snowboarding. She began competing in provincial races and finished 2nd in Québec at the end of the 1990–1991 season. In March 1991, she competed in her first international race in the prestigious Burton US Open in Stratton Mountain Resort, Vermont after winning the pre-qualification races to take the only available wildcard spot in the women's giant slalom (GS) and slalom (SL) events.

At the time she started boarding, there were very few women involved in the sport, and Kwadrans became actively involved in promoting the sport. She joined the board of Surf des Neiges Québec (Québec Snowboarding Association) and was their Director of Marketing between 1993 and 1995. She commissioned her brother to create the association's first logo (which he did pro-bono), developed its first media kit, actively promoted the sport in the province and was able to double sponsorship revenues to help grow the association's grass roots and competitive programs. In November 1993, Surf des Neiges Québec participated in the Super Salon de Sport et Plein Air (now known as 'Le Salon National du Grand Air'), which showcased the sport to over 70,000 visitors through live snowboarding demonstrations performed on a slope of snow that was created in the Montreal Olympic Stadium's stands. While actively competing in snowboarding, she also played for the Concordia Stingers in 1994–1995.

Kwadrans moved to Whistler, British Columbia and joined the Canadian National Alpine Snowboard Team in the summer of 1995. She immediately after the 1998 Nagano Olympics. No Canadian women had collected enough points to attend.

Academic and professional career
After retiring from snowboarding, Kwadrans returned to school in 1999 and completed her MBA at Athabasca University while working full-time. In December 2001, she graduated from Athabasca's Executive MBA program and was honoured with the University's Best Papers Award 2001/2002 for her thesis entitled Issues surrounding patenting intellectual property online.<ref>Issues surrounding patenting intellectual property online]</ref> Ms.

As she continued to progressively take on roles with more responsibility, Kwadrans decided an accounting designation would further support her professional growth. In the summer of 2012, she earned her Certified Management Accountants of Canada designation, now known as Chartered Professional Accountant. She began undertaking a second masters degree and was working towards her MSc in Innovation and Entrepreneurship from HEC Paris. Unfortunately she was forced to quit the program when she was diagnosed with terminal cancer.

Throughout her professional career, which spanned from 1999 to 2019, Kwadrans was focused on business strategy. She worked for some of Canada's and the world's largest organizations, such as Scotiabank, TELUS, PricewaterhouseCoopers, GE Capital, Best Buy Canada, Fasken, Manpower Inc. and Delta Hotels. Prior to getting diagnosed with cancer, which ended her career, she held the role of Vice-President, Sales & Performance Marketing at We Know Training (formerly Yardstick Training). She was also a part-time professor at various universities, including Mount Royal University and Yorkville University.

Personal life
Natalie was born in Montreal, Quebec) and is the daughter of Claudette (Lalonde) Andrès of Ontario, Canada and Robert Andrès of Lorraine, France. She also has a younger brother, Serge Andrès.

Kwadrans moved from Montreal to Whistler to compete in snowboarding for Team Canada. A year after retiring from snowboard racing, Natalie moved to Vancouver, British Columbia. She spent 8 years in Vancouver before relocating to Calgary, Alberta, where she has lived ever since.

Kwadrans is focused on maintaining her health and spending time with her two children, boyfriend and two Jack Russells.

FIS Snowboard World Cup results
Note: only top 30 finishes are listed. 
February 10, 1996 – Kanbayashi, Japan – FIS World Cup Circuit – GS – 17th
February 11, 1996 – Kanbayashi, Japan – FIS World Cup Circuit – Slalom – 19th
February 16, 1996 – Yomase, Japan – FIS World Cup Circuit – GS – 12th
February 24, 1996 – Calgary, AB – FIS World Cup Circuit – PSL – 22nd
March 2, 1996 – Sun Peaks, BC – FIS World Cup Circuit – PSL – 21st
March 14, 1996 – Mount Bachelor, OR – FIS World Cup Championships – GS – 20th
March 15, 1996 – Mount Bachelor, OR – FIS World Cup Championships – Slalom – 22nd
March 16, 1996 – Mount Bachelor, OR – FIS World Cup Championships – PSL – 21st
December 12, 1996 – Whistler, BC – FIS World Cup Circuit – Super G – 25th
December 12, 1996 – Whistler, BC – FIS World Cup Circuit – GS – 25th
December 18, 1996 – Sun Peaks, BC – FIS World Cup Circuit – GS – 29th
January 10, 1996 – Kirkwood, CA – FIS North-American Race – GS – 9th
February 1, 1997 – Mt. St. Anne, QC – FIS World Cup Circuit – Slalom – 29th
February 1, 1997 – Mount St. Anne, QC – FIS World Cup Circuit – GS – 27th
February 7, 1997 – Mount Bachelor, OR – FIS World Cup Championships – GS – 24th

 Media coverage 
 There is good that has come from this” – Calgary mom shares her cancer story, Alberta Cancer Foundation, July 18, 2019, retrieved July 19, 2019 at https://www.albertacancer.ca/calgary-mom-shares-her-cancer-story/
 2019 Drive for Thrive, University of Calgary Health & Wellness Lab, May 27, 2019, retrieved July 18, 2019 at https://vimeo.com/339048099
 FIS: PR: Mt. Bachelor Giant Slalom Results and Recap, Transworld Snowboarding Magazine, February 8, 1997
 Photo in crowd at the 1996 FIS Grundig World Cup welcome ceremonies, Transworld Snowboarding Magazine, February 1997
 Une année riche en émotions, Nord Info (Le Sportif monthly section / section mensuelle Le Sportif), décembre 1996 / December 1996
 Ruby captures women's Super G title, Whistler Question, December 16, 1996
 Shaken-up Andres on comeback trail, Vancouver Sun, December 14, 1996
 Mountain FM morning show, December 12, 1996
 [Article title unknown, Whistler Question, December 9, 1996
 Franc succès au Tournoi des optimistes, La Voix des Mille-Îles, 22 mai, 1996 / May 22, 1996
 Andrès reçoit l’appui des Optimistes, Nord Info, 19 mai, 1996 / May 19, 1996
 Natalie Andrès seule au sommet, Nord Info (cover page Le Sportif section / page couverture de la section Le Sportif), avril 1996 / April 1996
 Natalie Andrès frappée par un virus – Elle ratera la compétition en Californie, La Voix des Mille-Îles, 6 mars, 1996 / March 6, 1996
 Boarders Rippin’ and Ridin’ across continents, Blackcomb Ski Club Express, March 1996
 Natalie Andrès, 12e au Japon, Nord Info, 26 février 1996 / February 16, 1996
 Snowboard squad notches top 10 spots in Nagano GS'', Whistler Question, February 19, 1996

References

External links
Burton US Open
Canadian Snowboard Federation
FIS: PR: Mt. Bachelor Giant Slalom Results and Recap
La Voix des Mille-Îles
Le Salon National du Grand Air
Mountain FM
Nord Info
PM Magazine
Surf des Neiges Québec
Transworld Snowboarding Magazine
Vancouver Sun
Whistler Question

1973 births
Living people
Athabasca University alumni
Concordia University alumni
Canadian female snowboarders
Sportspeople from Montreal
Sportspeople from Calgary
Sportspeople from British Columbia
Marketing women
Canadian accountants
Canadian marketing people